Micronutrients  are nutrients such as vitamins and minerals required by organisms in varying quantities throughout life to orchestrate a range of physiological functions to maintain health.

The following is a list of micronutrients.

Minerals
 Calcium
 Sulfur
 Phosphorus
 Magnesium
 Sodium
 Potassium
 Iron
 Zinc

Trace elements 

 Boron
 Copper
 Chromium (disputed, as the European Union does not recognize chromium as an essential nutrient)
 Selenium
 Manganese
 Molybdenum
 Cobalt (as a component of vitamin B12)
 Fluorine
 Iodine

Vitamins

 Vitamin B complex
 Vitamin B1 (thiamin)
 Vitamin B2 (riboflavin)
 Vitamin B3 (niacin)
 Vitamin B5 (pantothenic acid)
 Vitamin B6 group:
Pyridoxine
Pyridoxal-5-Phosphate
Pyridoxamine
 Vitamin B7 (biotin)
 Vitamin B9 (folate)
 Vitamin B12 (cobalamin)
 Choline

 Vitamin A (e.g. retinol (see also - provitamin A carotenoids))
 Vitamin C (Ascorbic acid)
 Vitamin D
 Ergocalciferol
Cholecalciferol
 Vitamin E (tocopherols and tocotrienols)
 Vitamin K
 Vitamin K1 (phylloquinone)
 Vitamin K2 (menaquinone)
 Vitamin K3 (menadione)
 Carotenoids (not accepted as essential nutrients)
 Alpha carotene
 Beta carotene
 Cryptoxanthin
 Lutein
 Lycopene
 Zeaxanthin

See also
List of macronutrients
List of phytochemicals in food
Nutrient
Nutrition

References

Micronutrients